Martin Christopher Fray (born 18 January 1986) is an English professional footballer who currently plays for Hong Kong Premier League club HKFC.

Career statistics

Club

Notes

References

External links
 Yau Yee Football League profile

Living people
1986 births
English footballers
Association football defenders
Hong Kong First Division League players
Hong Kong Premier League players
Hong Kong FC players
English expatriate footballers
English expatriate sportspeople in Hong Kong
Expatriate footballers in Hong Kong